Richard Patrick Versace (April 16, 1940 – February 25, 2022) was an American basketball coach and executive. He was also the first American of Puerto Rican descent to have coached a National Basketball Association (NBA) team.

Early life
Versace was born in Fort Bragg, North Carolina. His parents were Colonel Humbert Joseph Versace, an Italian American and Marie Teresa Rios, a Puerto Rican-Irish American author. The 1960s television sitcom The Flying Nun was based on one of her books. He attended the University of Wisconsin–Madison, though he did not play basketball.

Versace coached at the high school and collegiate level and in the NBA. Versace coached at St. Joseph High School in Kenosha, Wisconsin, and Gordon Tech in Chicago. Oddly, his first coaching position after college was at Forrest-Strawn- Wing High School in the small Central Illinois community of Forrest during the years of 1964 and 1965. The odd thing being that he was the head football coach. He led the team to an 8-1 record and a Vermilion Valley Conference championship. He coached junior varsity basketball that winter. Versace began his college coaching career at St. Louis University in 1973, after compiling a 204-66 record at the high school coaching level. He then moved to Michigan State University, where he was heavily involved in the recruitment of Magic Johnson. Versace's first head coaching assignment was at the Jackson Community College in 1976. In the early 1980s, he was head men's basketball coach at Bradley University, where he led the team to the 1982 NIT championship. In the 1985-86 season, he was named National College Coach of the Year by the U.S. Basketball Writers' Association. That year, his Bradley Braves went 32-3 and were ranked as high as #7 in the nation during the season. His back court players included future NBA star Hersey Hawkins and future Bradley Head Coach Jim Les.

College
Versace became the head coach at Bradley University in 1978 and remained at Bradley until 1986. In his second season at Bradley the team finished first in the Missouri Valley Conference and qualifying for the NCAA tournament. Losing in the first round to Texas A&M. In 1981-82 Bradley finished first in the MVC but lost in the semifinals of the MVC tournament. They were not selected to the NCAA tournament but won the NIT championship. In Versace’s final season at Bradley they finished 32-3 for the season and 16-0 in the MVC. Losing in the second round of the NCAA tournament to eventual champion Louisville.

Season-by-season results

NBA
He later served as an assistant coach for the Detroit Pistons under head coach Chuck Daly.  Versace then became head coach of the Indiana Pacers for two years, from 1988 through 1990. After leaving the Pacers job, Versace became a sportscaster on TNT and on WMAQ TV in Chicago. Versace served as an assistant coach for the Milwaukee Bucks during the 1997-98 season.

In 1999, Versace was named President of Basketball Operations for the then-Vancouver Grizzlies.  After Versace's first season in Vancouver, the Grizzlies were relocated and became the Memphis Grizzlies.  And in 2002, the Grizzlies hired NBA legend Jerry West as President of Basketball Operations, and Versace assumed the role of General Manager and remained with the team through the end of the 2004-2005 season.  Prior to joining the Grizzlies, Versace worked for Michael Heisley's acquisition team as Versace oversaw Heisley's pursuit and ultimate purchase of the Vancouver Grizzlies.

Later years
On October 8, 2007, Versace announced that he would run as a Democratic Party candidate for Illinois' 18th Congressional District seat, then held by Republican Congressman Ray LaHood who was retiring. On December 8, 2007, however, Versace announced that he would not be running due to "unforeseen personal circumstances."

Personal life and death
Versace was the brother of Vietnam War posthumous Medal of Honor recipient Rocky Versace, who was executed by the Viet Cong while a Prisoner of War in 1965. He had two other brothers, Dr. Stephen Versace (his twin) and Michael Versace Rios, and a sister, Trilby Versace. Versace was divorced and had two children, David and Julie. He died on February 25, 2022, at the age of 81.

See also

 List of notable Puerto Ricans
Sports in Puerto Rico

References

External links
 BasketballReference.com: Dick Versace

1940 births
2022 deaths
American men's basketball coaches
American sportspeople of Puerto Rican descent
Basketball coaches from North Carolina
Bradley Braves men's basketball coaches
College men's basketball head coaches in the United States
Detroit Pistons assistant coaches
High school basketball coaches in Illinois
High school basketball coaches in Wisconsin
Illinois Democrats
Indiana Pacers head coaches
Memphis Grizzlies executives
Michigan State Spartans men's basketball coaches
Milwaukee Bucks assistant coaches
National Basketball Association broadcasters
People from Fort Bragg, North Carolina
Saint Louis Billikens men's basketball coaches
Sportspeople from Fayetteville, North Carolina
University of Wisconsin–Madison alumni